Hall Beach Airport  is located at Sanirajak, formerly Hall Beach, Nunavut, Canada, and is operated by the government of Nunavut.

Airlines and destinations

Canadian Helicopters operates flights as part of the North Warning System.

References

External links

Airports in the Arctic
Certified airports in the Qikiqtaaluk Region